is a private university in Mount Kōya, Wakayama Prefecture, Japan. The predecessor of the school was established in 1886 as a monastic school for Shingon Buddhist monks, and it was chartered as a university in 1926. In addition to its main campus, Koyasan University also operates a satellite school for working adults in Osaka.

Academics 
The university has strong ties to the Shingon sect of Buddhism and follows the educational principles of Kobodaishi Kūkai, the founder of Shingon. Historically, Koayasan University has largely specialized in training Buddhist monks, which includes operating a monastery for its students. However, in recent years the university has sought to diversity its curriculum and attract students who aspire to be teachers and social workers.

Koayasan University is notable for its library containing a range of rare manuscripts on Buddhism and other religions in Japan and East Asia, including several designated as National Important Cultural Property, and the library building itself being listed as tangible cultural property.

Departments 

 Department of Esoteric Buddhism
 Department of Humanistic Anthropology
 Graduate School (offers both an on-site and a distance learning MA program, as well as a PhD program)
 The Institute of Esoteric Culture (research institute)
 Library

Notable people

Faculty 

 Shizuteru Ueda, philosopher
 Joseph Kitagawa, religious scholar
 Tomokichi Fukurai, psychologist and early proponent of parapsychology

Alumni 

 Ekan Ikeguchi, Buddhist priest
 Kōyū Amano, monk, artist, and radio personality
 Shinzō Mitsuda(ja), novelist, winner of the Honkaku Mystery Award
 Shōko Ieda, non-fiction writer known for her controversial depictions of sexuality
 Eken Mine, actor and voice actor

See also
 Statue of B. R. Ambedkar (Japan)

References

External links
 Official website 
 Official website 
 Official website 

Educational institutions established in 1886
Private universities and colleges in Japan
Buddhist universities and colleges in Japan
Universities and colleges in Wakayama Prefecture
1886 establishments in Japan
Kōya, Wakayama